The Diocese of Lesotho is a diocese in the Anglican Church of Southern Africa. It comprises the entire nation of Lesotho. It is divided in three archdeaconries, Central Lesotho, Northern Lesotho and Southern Lesotho. The former bishop is Adam Taaso, in office since 2008 until 2020. The new elected bishop The Right Revd Dr Vicentia Kgabe was installed on the 5th of December 2021.

History 

Lesotho was originally included in the Anglican Diocese of the Free State but became an independent diocese in 1950, still with the name of Basutoland. His first bishop was John Maund, who would be in office from 1950 to 1976. Upon the independence from the United Kingdom in 1966, the diocese was renamed the Diocese of Lesotho.

The seat of the diocese is the Cathedral of St Mary and St James in Maseru.

List of Bishops 

 John Arrowsmith Maund 1950-1976
 Desmond Mpilo Tutu 1976-1978
 Philip Stanley Mokuku 1978-1997
 Andrew Thabo Duma 1997-1999
 Joseph Mahapu Tsubella 1999-2006
 See Vacant - 2007
 Adam Taaso 2008– 2020.
 Vicentia Kgabe was elected by the synod of bishops of the Anglican Church of Southern Africa, after the electoral college of the diocese of Lesotho failed to elect a successor to Taaso. She will be consecrated as a bishop at a later date.

Bishops suffragan 
 Fortescue Tumelo Makhetha
 Donald Nestor
 Andrew Thabo Duma

References

External links 

 
Anglican Church of Southern Africa dioceses
Christianity in Lesotho